"Yoshi City" is a song by Swedish rapper Yung Lean, released in 2014. It was the first single released for his debut album, Unknown Memory.

On June 17, 2014, a video for the song was released, directed by Marcus Söderlund. The Fader described it as "a glossy, big-budget Sad Boys production compared to the dial-up, Windows 95 quality of his other videos."

Track listing

Personnel
Yung Lean – Vocals

Production

Yung Gud – Producer

References

2014 singles
2014 songs
Yung Lean songs